Alannah Elizabeth Weston (born January 8, 1972) is an Irish-Canadian businesswoman who is the former chairman of the Selfridges Group.

Background 
Weston was born in Dublin, Ireland on January 8, 1972. She is the elder child of Hilary Weston and Galen Weston. She has one sibling, younger brother Galen Weston Jr. Weston is a citizen of both Ireland and Canada. She is married to Alex Cochrane (an architect and the elder son of Sir Marc Cochrane, 4th Baronet), with whom she has two children. Weston lives with her family in London.

Career 
Weston studied English literature at Merton College, Oxford. After graduation, she worked as a journalist at The Daily Telegraph, Tatler, and British Vogue. She left journalism in 1999 to work for Rose Marie Bravo at luxury fashion brand Burberry, where she was head of press. In 2001, Weston left Burberry to establish her own design agency, Zephyr Projects.

In 2004, Weston became creative director of Selfridges department store in London. She was appointed deputy chair of the Selfridges Group in 2014 and joined the board of directors of George Weston Limited in 2016. She became the chair of the Selfridges Group in 2019. As a member of the Weston family, she was ranked tenth on the 2021 Sunday Times Rich List. Weston is estimated to have a personal wealth of approximately €11 billion.

In August 2022, Weston stepped down as chairman of Selfridges Group upon the sale of the group to Thai conglomerate Central Group and Austria's Signa Holding.

Philanthropy 
From 2012 to 2017, Weston was a director of the Blue Marine Foundation, a British marine conservation charity. She leads the Selfridges Group Foundation and is a trustee of the Garfield Weston Foundation.

References 

Alumni of Merton College, Oxford
Living people
1972 births
People from County Dublin